Turn On the Bright Lights is the debut studio album by American rock band Interpol. It was released in the United Kingdom on August 19, 2002, and in the United States the following day, through independent record label Matador Records. The album was recorded in November 2001 at Tarquin Studios in Connecticut, and was co-produced, mixed and engineered by Peter Katis and Gareth Jones. Its title is taken from a repeated line in the song "NYC".

Upon release, the record peaked at number 101 on the UK Albums Chart. It reached number 158 on the Billboard 200 in the United States, as well as spending 73 weeks on the Billboard Independent Albums chart, peaking at number five. The songs "PDA", "Obstacle 1" and the double a-side single "Say Hello to the Angels" / "NYC" were released as singles, with music videos being shot for all except "Say Hello to the Angels".

Music 
In a brief interview about the fifteenth anniversary of Turn On the Bright Lights, guitarist Daniel Kessler stated the album's opening track, "Untitled" was written specifically to open the band's live shows. This leads into why the song is named "Untitled" because the band see the song as the intro song. Lead singer Paul Banks described the riff from the song as "signature Daniel".

Promotion and release
The release of Turn On the Bright Lights was preceded by the marketing of the band's self-titled EP Interpol in June 2002, their first release for Matador. The EP contained three tracks: radio single "PDA", future single "NYC", and "Specialist". All three tracks later appeared on the album, with "Specialist" included as a bonus track in Australian and Japanese editions. Further promotion continued at the beginning of the following year, when the band played the 2003 NME Awards Tour alongside the Datsuns, the Polyphonic Spree and the Thrills. The song "PDA" is featured as a playable track in 2008 video game Rock Band 2.

10th Anniversary Edition 
In 2012 a remastered version of the album was released in to commemorate its tenth anniversary. It featured additional material including demo recordings of several tracks, the bonus songs previously available on international releases and a DVD of live performances and music videos. Many of the demo recording tracks had been previously released however the 10th Anniversary Edition also contains five unreleased demo tracks from what is dubbed "Third Demo".

Critical reception

Turn On the Bright Lights was released to critical acclaim. The album holds a score of 81 out of 100 from the aggregate site Metacritic based on 21 reviews, indicating "universal acclaim". Contemporary reviews of the album often noted Interpol's influences and drew comparisons to several other acts. Michael Chamy of The Austin Chronicle cited "melodic Peter Hook-like basslines; the divine shoegazer textures of My Bloody Valentine and Ride; a peppy, Strokes-like bounce; and a singer who's a dead ringer for Ian Curtis." "It's almost as if Ian Curtis never hanged himself," began Blenders review, with critic Jonah Weiner adding that Paul Banks' vocals channeled Curtis' "gloomy moan." NMEs Victoria Segal called Joy Division comparisons "obvious and unmistakable, airbourne in the ashen atmospherics," while praising Interpol's take on the "grey-skinned British past". Billboard wrote that Interpol had created an "homage to their particular vision of the '80s that stands proudly alongside the best of its idols." Scott Seward, writing in The Village Voice, remarked: "If I like them because they remind me of eating bad bathtub mescaline in the woods and listening to Cure singles, well, that'll do. You might like them for completely different reasons."

Noel Murray of The A.V. Club opined that Interpol's virtue "lies in the way its music unfurls from pinched openings to wide-open codas", while Rob Sheffield of Rolling Stone wrote that their "sleek, melancholy sound is a thing of glacial beauty". Eric Carr of Pitchfork argued that the band had forged their own distinct sound, "a grander, more theatrical atmosphere with lush production that counters their frustrated bombast", praising Turn On the Bright Lights as "one of the most strikingly passionate records I've heard this year." However, The Village Voices Robert Christgau, naming it "Dud of the Month" in his Consumer Guide column, felt that Interpol "exemplify and counsel disengagement, self-seeking, a luxurious cynicism," downplaying Joy Division comparisons as "too kind". Qs lukewarm assessment of the album described it as "predictably claustrophobic listening".

At the end of the year, Turn On the Bright Lights featured on several publications' lists of the best albums of 2002, including those of Pitchfork, who named it the year's best album, NME, who ranked it at number ten, and Stylus Magazine, who ranked it at number five. The album placed at number 15 on The Village Voices year-end Pazz & Jop critics' poll.

Legacy
Hailed as a seminal album of the 2000s, Turn On the Bright Lights has been cited as an influence on many indie rock bands, including the Killers, Editors, the xx, the Organ, She Wants Revenge, and others to the extent that many of these bands have been disparagingly referred to as "Interpol clones". Closely associated with 9/11-era New York City, the album has been seen as helping define 2000s indie rock, and Interpol have been cited as helping usher in the New York-born post-punk revival scene, along with contemporaries such as the Strokes, Yeah Yeah Yeahs, and TV on the Radio. Summing up the album's impact in a review of its 2012 re-issue, Matt LeMay of Pitchfork wrote: "Suggesting that this album is simply a product of its time and place is no less naive than suggesting that anyone who has ever been in love could easily write, arrange and record an amazing love song. There were a lot of good bands in New York in 2002, but only one band made this record." In 2017, the band embarked on a worldwide tour to celebrate its 15th anniversary.

In a 2018 interview with Vice, Paul Banks stated: "as far as ease of making it, we had years to write these songs. The longest writing period of any of your records is your debut. We formed in 1997, so it’s five years, and three-and-a-half/four of playing shows and trying out that material. So it went down smoothly in the studio, and then you have all the excitement of it being your first album. It was a good time in our lives." Drummer Sam Fogarino reflected on the album by saying: "we were very naïve, we didn’t know how to make a record together, and we were lucky to have a good snapshot taken of who we were at the time. And we got a little more confident with every record."

At the end of the decade, the album has been featured on numerous lists:

{|class="wikitable sortable"
|-
!Publication
!Accolade
!Rank
|-
| Pitchfork
| 'Top 100 albums 2000-2004'
| align="center"|3
|-
| Pitchfork
| 'Top 200 albums of the 2000s'
| align="center"|20
|-
| Stylus
| 'Top 50 Albums 2000-2005'
| align="center"|6
|-
| Stylus
| 'Top 100 Albums of the 2000s'
| align="center"|20
|-
| NME
| '100 Greatest Albums of the Decade'
| align="center"|8
|-
| NME
| '500 Greatest Albums of All Time'
| align="center"|130
|-
| Rolling Stone
| '100 Best Albums of the Decade'
| align="center"|59
|-
| Under the Radar
| 'Top 200 Albums of the Decade'
| align="center"|3
|-
| Beats Per Minute
| 'Top 100 Albums of the Decade'
| align="center"|7
|-
| eMusic
| '100 Best Albums of the Decade'
| align="center"|9
|-
| Lost At Sea
| '2000-2009: Albums of the Decade'
| align="center"|13
|-
| The Irish Times
| 'Top 20 Albums of the Decade'
| align="center"|10
|-
| Consequence of Sound
| 'Top 100 Albums of the Decade'
| align="center"|35
|-
| musicOMH
| '21 Best Albums of the 2000s'
| align="center"|12 
|-
|The Guardian
|'100 Best Albums of the 21st Century'
|50
|-
|}

Track listing

 “Stella Was a Diver and She Was Always Down” is stylized in sentence case.

Bonus track on Australian edition
"Specialist" – 6:39

Bonus tracks on Japanese edition
Two different versions exist. One version has the following bonus tracks:
"Interlude" – 1:02
"Specialist" – 6:39

The other version has the following bonus tracks:
"Hands Away" (Peel session)
"Obstacle 2" (Peel session)
"PDA" (video)
"NYC" (video)
"Obstacle 1" (video)

Bonus tracks on Mexican edition
"Interlude" – 1:02
"Specialist" – 6:39
"PDA" (video)
"NYC" (video)
"Obstacle 1" (video)

Personnel
Interpol
Paul Banks – lead vocals, rhythm guitar
Daniel Kessler – lead guitar, backing vocals
Carlos D – bass, keyboards
Samuel Fogarino – drums, percussion

Audio Engineers
All songs recorded by Peter Katis
Tracks 1, 2, 4, 5, 7, 9, 10 mixed by Peter Katis
Tracks 3, 6, 8, 11 mixed by Gareth Jones
Recorded and mixed at Tarquin Studios
Mastered by Greg Calbi at Sterling Sound

Charts

Certifications and sales

|-

See also 
 Album era

References

External links

2002 debut albums
Interpol (band) albums
Matador Records albums
Albums produced by Peter Katis
Albums produced by Gareth Jones (music producer)